Vyacheslav Pereteyko (born December 19, 1980 in Tashkent) is an Uzbek judoka, who competed in the men's middleweight category. He picked up a bronze medal in the 90-kg division at the 2002 Asian Games in Busan, South Korea, and represented his nation Uzbekistan at the 2004 Summer Olympics.

Pereteyko made sporting headlines at the 2002 Asian Games in Busan, South Korea, where he overpowered China's Teng Guangying with a brilliant ippon victory to grab the bronze medal in the 90-kg division.

At the 2004 Summer Olympics in Athens, Pereteyko qualified for the Uzbek squad in the men's middleweight class (90 kg), by placing second and receiving a berth from the Asian Championships in Almaty, Kazakhstan. By the mighty commotion of the home crowd inside Ano Liossia Hall to favor their opponent Dionysios Iliadis, Pereteyko failed to apply pressure on his opponent, and thereby lost his opening match by an ippon and a kouchi gari (small inner reap) within two minutes.

References

External links

1981 births
Living people
Uzbekistani male judoka
Olympic judoka of Uzbekistan
Judoka at the 2004 Summer Olympics
Judoka at the 2002 Asian Games
Asian Games medalists in judo
Sportspeople from Tashkent
Asian Games bronze medalists for Uzbekistan
Medalists at the 2002 Asian Games
21st-century Uzbekistani people